Townsend Television is an American sketch comedy/variety show starring Robert Townsend who also served as the series’ executive producer. The series featured an ensemble cast including John Witherspoon, Barry Diamond and Paula Jai Parker and aired on Fox from September 12, 1993 to December 26, 1993.

Overview
Each episode featured stand-up comedy from Robert Townsend. There are also musical numbers and comedy sketches, including spoofs of movies and commercials, performed by the regulars and guests.

Regulars
 Robert Townsend
 John Witherspoon
 Barry Diamond
 Paula Jai Parker
 Roxanne Beckford
 Darrel Heath
 Lester Barrie
 Biz Markie
 The Paul Jackson Orchestra
 The Russel Clark Dancers

References

1990s American sketch comedy television series
1993 American television series debuts
1993 American television series endings
English-language television shows
Fox Broadcasting Company original programming